Matija Nastasić (born 28 March 1993) is a Serbian professional footballer who plays as a centre-back for Spanish La Liga club Mallorca and the Serbia national team.

He began his career at Partizan, and after a loan to Teleoptik joined Italian side Fiorentina in 2011. After one season there he transferred to Manchester City for €15 million and a swap with Stefan Savić, winning the Premier League in 2014, despite injury problems. In 2015, he joined Schalke, where he remained for seven years, before returning to Fiorentina in 2021.

Nastasić made his senior international debut for Serbia in 2012, and has gone on to earn over 30 caps.

Club career

Partizan
Matija Nastasić is a product of Partizan youth academy. Unable to find space in the Partizan first team setup, he was sent out on loan to Serbian second division side FK Teleoptik from Zemun. There, the young, left footed centre back made 21 appearances and caught the eye of Fiorentina sporting director at that time, Pantaleo Corvino, who signed him in a deal for €4 million.

Fiorentina
Nastasić spent some time in the Fiorentina youth side but, due to a lack of quality centre backs in the squad and suspensions and injuries, he trained with the first team on many occasions. Fellow Serbian and Fiorentina manager Siniša Mihajlović handed him his Serie A debut on 11 September 2011 in a 2–0 win against Bologna. He went on to make a further 25 appearances that season but one stood out more than any and it was during this performance that he announced himself to Italian and World football. It was a match between La Viola and Milan at the Stadio Artemio Franchi. Nastasić showed many of his qualities – tackling, comfort on the ball, tactical astuteness. It was these qualities that led to a deadline day transfer to English side Manchester City in a move worth €24.4 million, excluding the value of Stefan Savić who was given to Fiorentina as part of the exchange.

Manchester City

Nastasić signed a five-year contract with Manchester City, ending on 30 June 2017. He was part of an exchange deal with Stefan Savić. He made his debut for the club on 18 September 2012, starting in a Champions League away fixture against Real Madrid at the Santiago Bernabéu Stadium. He made his Premier League debut on 29 September in a 2–1 win against Fulham. He cemented his place in the starting XI and his great form won him the club's Player of the Month Award for November. Quickly becoming a fan favourite, the youngster pushed 30-year-old Joleon Lescott out of the starting lineup in centre-back position and was selected to start in the 2013 FA Cup Final, a 1–0 defeat by Wigan Athletic. In May 2013, he was named Manchester City's Young Player of the Season.

Nastasić had a less successful season in 2013–14, missing the majority of the campaign through injury. He made 13 league appearances and Manchester City won the Premier League title.

Schalke 04
On 13 January 2015, having not featured for City during the season, he was loaned to German club Schalke 04 for its remainder. He made his debut on 31 January, starting in a 1–0 home win over Hannover 96. Having not featured in the Champions League that season, he featured in both legs of Schalke's elimination by Real Madrid in the Last 16.

On 11 March 2015, Schalke 04 activated the transfer clause on his loan deal, believed to be €12 million, and Nastasić signed a four-year contract with the German club.

On 8 August 2015, Nastasić marked his season debut by scoring his first goal for the club, in a 5–0 win at MSV Duisburg in the first round of the DFB-Pokal.

In June 2018, along with goalkeeper Ralf Fährmann, Nastasić sign a contract extension with Schalke to stay with the club until the summer of 2022.

Return to Fiorentina 
In August 2021, Nastasić signed for Fiorentina again following Schalke 04's relegation from the Bundesliga as a replacement for Germán Pezzella, who moved to Real Betis Balompie the same week.

Mallorca 
On 1 September 2022, Nastasić signed a one-year contract with Mallorca in Spain, with an option to extend.

International career
Having already represented Serbia's youth sides, Nastasić made his debut for the Serbian national team on 29 February 2012, in a match against Cyprus.

He was named in Serbia's preliminary squad for the 2018 FIFA World Cup in Russia, but failed to make the 23-man final squad.

Career statistics

Club

International

Honours
Manchester City
Premier League: 2013–14
FA Cup runner-up: 2012–13

Individual
Manchester City Young Player of the Year: 2012–13

References

External links

1993 births
Living people
Sportspeople from Valjevo
Serbian footballers
Association football defenders
FK Partizan players
FK Teleoptik players
ACF Fiorentina players
Manchester City F.C. players
FC Schalke 04 players
RCD Mallorca players
Serbian First League players
Serie A players
Premier League players
Bundesliga players
FA Cup Final players
Serbia youth international footballers
Serbia under-21 international footballers
Serbia international footballers
Serbian expatriate footballers
Expatriate footballers in England
Expatriate footballers in Germany
Expatriate footballers in Italy
Expatriate footballers in Spain
Serbian expatriate sportspeople in England
Serbian expatriate sportspeople in Germany
Serbian expatriate sportspeople in Italy
Serbian expatriate sportspeople in Spain